Brent Primus (born April 12, 1985) is an American mixed martial artist currently competing for Bellator MMA, where he is the former Bellator Lightweight World Champion. As of March 14, 2023, he is #4 in the Bellator Lightweight Rankings.

Background
Born and raised in Eugene, Oregon, Primus attended Sheldon High School, where he played soccer and helped the team tie South Eugene High School for the co-state title. He later began training in Brazilian jiu-jitsu, earning his black belt in only six years.

Primus had a tumultuous childhood and teenage years, having never seen his real father outside of a prison, except for catching him on an episode of “Cops” once as a child. At the age of 13, he found himself homeless after being kicked out of the house by his step father. After this, he bounced around from home to home until he began selling pounds of weed to finance himself. At 15, Primus had his own house from these proceeds. At age 16, his home was raided by rival gangsters, with Primus held up at gunpoint. At 18, his home was raided by police and Primus was sent to jail. During this time, Primus was partying and finding himself in fights on a weekly basis, leading to one of Primus’ friends to sign him up for an amateur fight, which lead him onto his career in MMA.

Mixed martial arts career

Early career
Primus compiled an amateur record of 5-1 before making his professional debut in September 2010, defeating Chris Ensley via first-round submission. In his second pro bout, Primus defeated Roy Bradshaw via submission in the first round on May 12, 2012.

Bellator MMA
Primus signed with Bellator in 2013. He made his debut for the organization on September 27, 2013, at Bellator 101 against Scott Thometz. Primus won via rear-naked choke submission at 3:48 in the first round, improving his record to 3–0.

Primus had his second bout with the organization on November 22, 2013, at Bellator 109. He defeated Brett Glass by rear-naked choke submission in the first round.

In his next bout, Primus faced Chris Jones at Bellator 111 on March 7, 2014. Primus won via TKO in the first round, which marked the first time Primus had finished an opponent that was not by rear-naked choke.

After nearly a year-and-a-half away from the sport, Primus returned to face Derek Anderson at Bellator 141 on August 28, 2015.  He won the fight by split decision.

Primus next faced Gleristone Santos at Bellator 153 on April 22, 2016. He won the fight by split decision.

Bellator Lightweight World Champion
With an undefeated streak of five wins in Bellator, Primus faced Bellator Lightweight champion Michael Chandler at Bellator NYC on June 24, 2017. At 2:22 in the first round, the bout was temporarily halted by the referee to check on Chandler, whose left ankle was visibly injured. The bout was stopped in favor of Primus via TKO, awarding him the Bellator Lightweight World Championship and pulling off one of the biggest upsets in Bellator history.

Primus was expected to make his first title defense against Chandler in a rematch at Bellator 197 on April 13, 2018. However, he pulled out of the fight due to a knee injury. As a result, Brandon Girtz stepped in as a replacement.

The rematch between Primus and Chandler finally took place in the main event of Bellator 212 on December 14, 2018. Primus was out-wrestled for the better part of the fight, and despite landing similar leg kicks to those that stopped Chandler in their first fight and dropping Chandler with a punch in the second round, Primus was defeated by Chandler via unanimous decision.

Post-title era
As the first fight after losing his title, Primus faced Tim Wilde at Bellator: Birmingham on May 4, 2019. He won the fight via gogoplata in the first round.

Primus was expected to face Peter Queally at Bellator 240 on February 22, 2020. However, Queally was forced to withdraw from the bout due to knee injury and was subsequently replaced by Chris Bungard. Primus won the bout via neck-crank submission in the 1st round.

On April 17, 2021, Primus announced signing a new 6-fight contract.

Primus faced Islam Mamedov on July 31, 2021, at Bellator 263. He lost the bout via split decision.

Primus faced Benson Henderson on October 16, 2021, at Bellator 268. He won the fight via unanimous decision.

Primus faced Alexandr Shabliy at Bellator 282 on June 24, 2022. He lost the bout via TKO in the second round.

Lightweight Grand Prix 
After an original contestant of the $1 million Bellator Lightweight World Grand Prix, Sidney Outlaw, was suspended for a positive drug test, Primus replaced him for the quater-final bout against Mansour Barnaoui on May 12, 2023, at Bellator 296.

Championships and awards
Bellator MMA
Bellator Lightweight World Championship (One time)
MMAJunkie.com
2019 May Submission of the Month

Mixed martial arts record

|-
|Loss
|align=center|11–3
|Alexandr Shabliy
|TKO (punches)
|Bellator 282
|
|align=center|2
|align=center|1:22
|Uncasville, Connecticut, United States
|
|-
|Win
|align=center|11–2
|Benson Henderson
|Decision (unanimous)
|Bellator 268 
|
|align=center|3
|align=center|5:00
|Phoenix, Arizona, United States 
|
|-
|Loss
|align=center|10–2
|Islam Mamedov
|Decision (split)
|Bellator 263
|
|align=center|3
|align=center|5:00
|Los Angeles, California, United States
|
|-
|Win
|align=center|10–1
|Chris Bungard
|Submission (neck crank)	
|Bellator 240
|
|align=center|1
|align=center|1:55
|Dublin, Ireland
|
|-
|Win
|align=center|9–1
|Tim Wilde	
|Submission (gogoplata)	
|Bellator: Birmingham
|
|align=center|1
|align=center|1:20
|Birmingham, England, United Kingdom
|
|-
|Loss
|align=center|8–1
|Michael Chandler
|Decision (unanimous)
|Bellator 212
|
|align=center|5
|align=center|5:00
|Honolulu, Hawaii, United States
|
|-
|Win
|align=center|8–0
|Michael Chandler
|TKO (doctor stoppage)
|Bellator NYC
|
|align=center|1
|align=center|2:22
|New York City, New York, United States
|
|-
| Win
| align=center|7–0
| Gleristone Santos
| Decision (split)
| Bellator 153
| 
| align=center| 3
| align=center| 5:00
| Uncasville, Connecticut, United States
|
|-
| Win
| align=center|6–0 
| Derek Anderson
| Decision (split)
| Bellator 141
| 
| align=center| 3
| align=center| 5:00
| Temecula, California, United States
|
|-
|Win
|align=center|5–0
|Chris Jones
|TKO (punches)
|Bellator 111
|
|align=center|1
|align=center|1:45
|Thackerville, Oklahoma, United States
|
|-
|Win
|align=center|4–0
|Brett Glass
|Submission (rear-naked choke)
|Bellator 109
|
|align=center|1
|align=center|3:20
|Bethlehem, Pennsylvania, United States 
|
|-
|Win
|align=center|3–0
|Scott Thometz
|Submission (rear-naked choke)
|Bellator 101
|
|align=center|1
|align=center|3:48
|Portland, Oregon, United States
|
|-
|Win
|align=center|2–0
|Roy Bradshaw
|Submission (rear-naked choke)
|Midtown Productions: Midtown Throwdown 4
|
|align=center|1
|align=center|1:42
|Eugene, Oregon, United States
|
|-
|Win
|align=center|1–0
|Chris Ensley
|Submission (rear-naked choke)
|BKP: Springfield Throwdown 1
|
|align=center|1
|align=center|1:05
|Springfield, Oregon, United States
|

Submission grappling record
{| class="wikitable sortable" style="font-size:80%; text-align:left;"
|-
| colspan=8 style="text-align:center;" | ? Matches, ? Wins (? Submissions), ? Losses (? Submissions), 0 Draws
|-
!  Result
!  style="text-align:center;"| Rec.
!  Opponent
!  Method
!  Event
!  Division
!  Date
!  Location
|-
|Loss
|style="text-align:center;"|3–5–0
| Craig Jones
|Submission (Rear Naked Choke)
|Submission Underground 19
| 
|December 20, 2020
|Portland, Oregon, U.S.
|-
|Win
|style="text-align:center;"|3–4–0
| Jake Shields
| Submission (armbar)
|Submission Underground 14
|
|May 31, 2020
|Portland, Oregon, U.S.
|-
|Loss
|style="text-align:center;"|2–4–0
| Gabriel Rollo
| Points
|Pan Am Jiu Jitsu 2013
|
|May 23, 2013
|-
|Loss
|style="text-align:center;"|2–3–0
| Bernardo Faria
| Armlock
|Pan Am Jiu Jitsu 2013
|
|May 23, 2013
|-
|Win
|style="text-align:center;"|2–2–0
| Oliver Geddes
| -
|Pan Am Jiu Jitsu 2013
|
|May 23, 2013
|-
|Loss
|style="text-align:center;"|1–2–0
| Otavio Sousa
| -
|Pan Am Jiu Jitsu 2012
|
|May 30, 2012
|-
|Loss
|style="text-align:center;"|1–1–0
| Murilo Santana
| Points
|Pan Am Jiu Jitsu 2012
|
|May 30, 2012
|-
|Win
|style="text-align:center;"|1–0–0
| Chris Atkins
| Choke
|Pan Am Jiu Jitsu 2012
|
|May 30, 2012
|-

See also 
 List of current Bellator fighters
 List of male mixed martial artists

References

Living people
1985 births
American male mixed martial artists
Mixed martial artists from Oregon
Sportspeople from Eugene, Oregon
Lightweight mixed martial artists
Mixed martial artists utilizing Brazilian jiu-jitsu
Bellator MMA champions
American practitioners of Brazilian jiu-jitsu
People awarded a black belt in Brazilian jiu-jitsu
Submission grapplers